New York City is home to the second-largest Taiwanese American population, after the Los Angeles metropolitan area, California, enumerating an estimated 40,000 to 50,000 individuals as of 2020.

History and location
The Flushing neighborhood of the borough of Queens in New York City, is one of the largest and fastest growing Taiwanese enclaves outside Asia. Main Street and the area to its west, particularly along Roosevelt Avenue, have become the primary nexus of Flushing's Taiwanese community. However, this community continues to expand southeastward along Kissena Boulevard and northward beyond Northern Boulevard. Taiwanese began the surge of immigration in the 1980s. Flushing originally started off as Little Taipei or Little Taiwan due to the large Taiwanese population. Due to the dominance at the time of working class Cantonese immigrants of Manhattan's Chinatown including its poor housing conditions, the more affluent Taiwanese population could not relate to them socioeconomically and settled in Flushing.

Later on, when other groups of non-Cantonese Chinese, mostly speaking Mandarin started arriving into New York City, like the Taiwanese, they could not relate to Manhattan's then dominant Cantonese Chinatown, as a result they mainly settled with Taiwanese to be around Mandarin Chinese speakers. Later, Flushing's Chinatown would become the main center of different Chinese regional groups and cultures in New York City. By 1990, Asians constituted 41% of the population of the core area of Flushing, with Chinese in turn representing 41% of the Asian population. However, ethnic Chinese, including Taiwanese, are constituting an increasingly dominant proportion of the Asian population as well as of the overall population in Flushing and its Chinatown. A 1986 estimate by the Flushing Chinese Business Association approximated 60,000 Chinese in Flushing alone. Mandarin Chinese, commonly spoken by Taiwanese, has becom the lingua franca in New York City's ethnic Chinese communities.

Elmhurst, another neighborhood in Queens, also has a large and growing Taiwanese community. Previously a small area with Chinese shops on Broadway between 81st Street and Cornish Avenue, this new Chinatown has now expanded to 45th Avenue and Whitney Avenue. Since 2000, thousands of Taiwanese Americans have migrated into Whitestone, Queens (白石), given the sizeable presence of the neighboring Flushing Chinatown, and have continued their expansion eastward in Queens and into neighboring affluent and highly educated Nassau County (拿騷縣) on Long Island (長島). Facilitating migration from Taiwan to New York City is China Airlines, which flies non-stop between Taipei Taoyuan International Airport and JFK International Airport in Queens.

Taiwanese New Yorkers

Academia and humanities
 Tim Wu – professor at Columbia Law School

Academia and sciences
 David Ho – scientific researcher and Helen Wu professor at Columbia University

Entrepreneurship and technology
 Andrew Yang – founder, Venture for America; U.S. 2020 Democratic presidential candidate and pioneer of the Universal Basic Income concept

Law, politics, and diplomacy
 Grace Meng – member of the United States House of Representatives, representing New York's 6th congressional district in Queens
 Yuh-Line Niou – member of the New York State Assembly, representing the 65th District in Lower Manhattan, elected in November 2016
 John Liu – first Taiwanese American and Asian American to be elected New York City Comptroller, in 2009

Media
 Eddie Huang – writer, journalist, author of Fresh Off the Boat: A Memoir
 Jennifer 8. Lee – journalist, credits including The New York Times
 Hua Hsu – journalist, The New Yorker
 Jeff Yang – media consultant, "Tao Jones" columnist for The Wall Street Journal

Theater, arts, and culture
 Malan Breton – fashion designer
 Jenny Lin – pianist
 Joseph Lin – violinist
 Alexander Wang – fashion designer
 Jason Wu – fashion designer
 Sophia Yan – classical pianist; journalist

See also 

 Asian Americans in New York City
 Chinese people in New York City
 Bangladeshis in New York City
 Demographics of New York City
 Filipinos in the New York metropolitan area
 Fuzhounese in New York City
 Indians in the New York City metropolitan region
 Japanese in New York City
 Koreans in New York City
 Russians in New York City
 Taiwanese Americans

References 

Taiwanese people by location
Ethnic groups in New York City
Taiwanese-American culture